Warwick Road is an arterial east-west road located in the northern suburbs of Perth, Western Australia. It was built in 1969 to service the Shire of Wanneroo parts of the Hamersley Development Scheme, which was later split into the suburbs of Duncraig, Warwick and Greenwood. Its original alignment, which was gazetted in 1949 as Road No. 10578 by the Wanneroo Road Board, was a straight east-west road extending to Alexander Drive, but in the mid-1970s, the alignment was altered southwards in the vicinity of the freeway alignment (the Mitchell Freeway was not, however, built until 1986), and in the late 1970s, the section east of Wanneroo Road was split off to form Marangaroo Drive.

Apart from the Glengarry and Greenwood neighbourhood shopping centres, Warwick Road also passes Warwick Open Space east of Erindale Road and the Percy Doyle Reserve, which includes sports and recreation facilities and the Duncraig Library, near Marmion Avenue.

Major intersections

  Marmion Avenue (State Route 71), Sorrento and 
 Chessell Drive, Duncraig
 Lilburne Road, Duncraig
 Glengarry Drive, Duncraig
 Davallia Road, Duncraig
  Mitchell Freeway (State Route 2), Duncraig,  and 
 Dorchester Avenue, Warwick
 Coolibah Drive, Greenwood
 Ballantine Road, Warwick
 Allenswood Road, Greenwood
  Erindale Road (State Route 77) south / Cockman Road north, Greenwood and Warwick
  Wanneroo Road (State Route 60 / State Route 81 north), Greenwood, Warwick and Girrawheen

See also

References

Roads in Perth, Western Australia
Articles containing video clips